John West Sinclair (January 6, 1900 – February 13, 1945) was an American actor who worked primarily in silent films.

Early life and career
Tennessee-born comedian Sinclair, was a favorite stunt double for such 1920s action heroes as Ken Maynard, Billy Sullivan and Reed Howes. Later he wrote gags for W.C. Fields' comedies It's a Gift and Man on the Flying Trapeze, and had uncredited walk-on roles in several sound-era films.

Sinclair's residence was at 8229 Blackburn Avenue, Los Angeles, California. He was married to actress Thelma Hill.

Death
Sinclair died on February 13, 1945, of cirrhosis of the liver, at the age of 45. He is buried at Pierce Brothers Valhalla Memorial Park, in North Hollywood in a grave marked only by a brass plate with nothing engraved upon it.

Partial filmography
 Fighting Fate (1925)
 Cyclone Cavalier (1925)
 High Spirits (1927)
 It Pays to Advertise (1931)
 Million Dollar Legs (1932)
 High Gear (1933)
 Kiss and Make-Up (1934)
 Car 99 (1935)
 Secret Service of the Air (1939)
 The Great American Broadcast (1941)
 All Through the Night (1942)
 They Got Me Covered (1943)
 Hail the Conquering Hero (1944)

References

External links
 

1900 births
1945 deaths
American male film actors
American male silent film actors
Male actors from Tennessee
Deaths from cirrhosis
20th-century American male actors